The 1965 Tour de France started with 130 cyclists, divided into 13 teams of 10 cyclists:

The Molteni-Ignis team was a combined team, with 5 cyclists from Molteni and 5 from Ignis.

Jacques Anquetil, who won the previous four Tours de France (1961–1964), did not participate in this tour; this made Raymond Poulidor, who became second in the previous Tour, the main favourite.

Start list

By team

By rider

By nationality

References

1965 Tour de France
1965